The Groupe École supérieure de commerce de Troyes (also called Y SCHOOLS) is a group of higher education establishments, including a higher business school founded in 1992.

History 
In the 1960s, the École de commerce et de gestion (ECG) was established.

In 1992, the ECG was transformed into a Business School, with the sponsorship of HEC, ESCP Business School, Danone and KPMG.

In 2005, ESC Troyes joined the Conférence des grandes écoles.

In 2008, the merger with the ADPS Group (continuing and approved training) was formalized.

In 2011, the initial training activities of the business school, BBA and École supérieure de tourisme left the Chamber of Commerce and Industry of Troyes and merged with the initial training activities of the École supérieure de design. 

In 2012, a new communication was put in place with a new logo and a new website which brings together all the activities of initial training, continuing education, services and academic support under the single name of Groupe ESC Troyes, abandoning in the process all reference to the old ADPS mark (which remains only attached to socio-professional activities to help people get back to work).

References

External links
 ESC Troyes

Business schools in France
Education in Troyes
Educational institutions established in 1992